Farm to Market Roads in Texas are owned and maintained by the Texas Department of Transportation (TxDOT).

FM 600

Farm to Market Road 600 (FM 600) is located in Haskell, Jones and Taylor counties.

FM 600 begins at I-20 in Abilene and runs in a northern direction along West Lake Road before turning northeast at FM 3308 and turning back north at FM 3034. In northern Abilene, the highway runs near the western shore of Fort Phantom Hill Lake, leaving the city limits north of the FM 1082 intersection. FM 600 runs through rural areas of Jones County, intersecting US 180 east of Anson and has a short overlap with SH 6 through the town of Avoca. After the overlap with SH 6, the highway runs in an eastern direction before turning back north at County Road 223. FM 600 crosses over Lake Stamford before sharing an overlap with FM 618 near Paint Creek. The highway runs through rural areas of Haskell County before ending at an intersection with US 380 on the eastern edge of Haskell.

FM 600 was designated on July 25, 1945, running from US 380 (now SH 6) to a point  to the northeast. On December 16, 1948, the highway was extended further north to FM 142. On September 27, 1960, FM 600 was extended north to FM 618. On October 22, 1962, FM 600 was rerouted over a section of FM 142 south and west to US 380 (now SH 6), while the old route east and south to Lueders was transferred to FM 142. FM 600 absorbed FM 1834 north of FM 618 and FM 1193 south of US 380, extending the highway to I-20. On June 27, 1995, the section of FM 600 between I-20 and FM 3034 was redesignated Urban Road 600 (UR 600). The designation reverted to FM 600 with the elimination of the Urban Road system on November 15, 2018.

Junction list

FM 601

Farm to Market Road 601 (FM 601) is located in Shackelford County. Its western terminus is at SH 6 southeast of Albany. Its eastern terminus is at FM 576.

FM 602

Farm to Market Road 602 (FM 602) is located in Floyd County. It runs from FM 786 at Rushing Chapel to FM 1958. There is a concurrency with US 70.

FM 602 was designated on May 23, 1951, from FM 786 at Rushing Chapel south to US 70. On October 26, 1983, the section from US 70 to FM 1958 was added, creating a concurrency with US 70.

Junction list

FM 602 (1945)

The first FM 602 was designated on August 3, 1945, from Cross Plains south to the Brown County line. On August 23, 1945, SH 279 was extended north over FM 602. The FM 602 designation would subsequently be cancelled on September 26, 1945.

FM 603

Farm to Market Road 603 (FM 603) is located in rural Callahan County.

FM 603 begins at SH 36 west of the community of Denton. It proceeds north, passing through the community of Eula. It crosses FM 18 before reaching its northern terminus at  I-20 west of Clyde.

On September 19, 1951, US 80 was relocated a mile to the north, and the old route was replaced by  FM 18. On September 20, 1961, it was extended an additional half mile to the north, to the new routing of US 80, which later became  I-20.

Junction list

FM 604

Farm to Market Road 604 (FM 604) is located in Taylor, Callahan, and Shackelford counties. The highway runs from US 83 southwest of Ovalo eastward and northward to SH 351 northeast of Abilene.

Junction list

FM 605

Farm to Market Road 605 (FM 605) is located in Jones County. Its western terminus is at FM 126 near Merkel, just north of the Jones–Taylor county line. Its eastern terminus is at US 83 in Hawley.

Junction list

FM 606

Farm to Market Road 606 (FM 606) is located in Willacy County in the Rio Grande Valley. The highway is located in the community of Port Mansfield and passes mainly through residential areas.

FM 606 begins at SH 186 as a two-lane road. The road proceeds north-northwest, passing numerous small houses and empty housing lots and intersecting several small local roads. The highway bends slightly, proceeding in a northward direction and passing several more houses before intersecting County Road 4150. The route continues northward, passing several more small houses and lots before passing a small park and the Fred Stone County Fishing Pier. The highway proceeds a short distance northward before reaching its northern terminus at a dead end point.

FM 606 was designated on October 26, 1954, on the current route, from FM 497 (now SH 186) to a dead end point.

FM 606 (1945)

On December 16, 1948, the route was extended north  to US 83. FM 606 was cancelled on October 22, 1954, and combined with FM 126.

FM 607

Farm to Market Road 607 (FM 607) is located in Henderson County. It runs from SH 31 at Brownsboro to Loop 60 at La Rue.

FM 607 was designated on November 20, 1951, on the current route. This was a renumbering  a portion of FM 314, which was rerouted on a new road to the east. This portion of FM 314 was numbered as FM 313 until December 3, 1948, but FM 313 was already assigned elsewhere on May 23, 1951.

FM 607 (1945)

The first FM 607 was designated on July 28, 1945, from FM 53 (now SH 153) east via Nolan to Dora. On August 26, 1948, the road was extended to the Taylor County line. FM 607 was cancelled on November 20, 1951, and combined with FM 126.

FM 608

Farm to Market Road 608 (FM 608) is located in Nolan and Fisher counties.
 
FM 608 was designated on July 26, 1945, from US 80 (now Business I-20) in Roscoe south  to Highland School. On February 27, 1948, FM 608 was extended to Maryneal. On September 29, 1954, FM 608 was extended northeast to SH 70. On October 31, 1957, FM 608 was extended to the Nolan–Fisher county line. On September 27, 1960, FM 608 was extended north to FM 611, yielding its current route.

FM 609

Farm to Market Road 609 (FM 609) is located in Fayette County. It runs from US 90 in Flatonia northeast to Business SH 71-E west of La Grange.

FM 609 was designated on May 23, 1951, from US 90 in Flatonia northeast  to a road intersection. On December 17, 1952, the road was extended northeast to SH 71 (now Business SH 71-E), replacing FM 1294. On September 5, 1973, the section from SH 71 northwest  was added, creating a concurrency with SH 71. This concurrency was removed in 1977, when the section was cancelled.

FM 609 (1945)

The first FM 609 was designated on July 23, 1945, from Longworth west to SH 70. FM 609 was cancelled on December 16, 1948, and combined with FM 57.

FM 610

Farm to Market Road 610 (FM 610) is located in Fisher and Stonewall counties.

FM 610 was designated on July 23, 1945, from SH 70 to the Stonewall-Fisher County Line. Seven days later, FM 610 was extended to Aspermont.

FM 611

Farm to Market Road 611 (FM 611) is located in Fisher County.

FM 611 was designated on July 23, 1945, from US 180 northward  to Hobbs. On May 23, 1951, FM 611 was extended north to FM 646. On July 11, 1951, FM 611 was extended east to SH 70, replacing FM 646. On October 31, 1957, FM 611 was extended south . On October 31, 1958, FM 611 was extended to its end at FM 419.

FM 612

FM 613

FM 614

FM 615

Farm to Market Road 615 (FM 615) is located in Fayette County.

FM 615 (1945)

The first FM 615 was designated on July 30, 1945, from Merkel southwest to Blair. FM 615 was cancelled on December 16, 1948, and combined with FM 126.

FM 616

Farm to Market Road 616 (FM 616) is located in Victoria, Jackson, and Matagorda counties. It runs from SH 185 at Bloomington to SH 35 at Blessing.

FM 616 was designated on July 25, 1945, from SH 172 at La Ward east 5 miles. On August 4, 1945, FM 616 was changed to that it instead went from SH 172 west  to Lolita. On February 25, 1949, the road was extended north  to a road intersection. On July 14 of that year, a  section from the end of FM 616 to SH 111 was added. On March 27, 1951, the section from SH 111 to Lolita was renumbered FM 1593, while the section from FM 234 at Vanderbilt to Lolita was added. On October 18, 1954, the road was extended west to La Salle, replacing a section of FM 234. On November 27, 1954, the road extended east to SH 35 at Blessing, replacing FM 1727 (the section from SH 35 to Blessing is former Spur 93 and previously SH 177). On October 31, 1958, the road was extended southwest to the Victoria County Line. On November 25, 1958, the road was extended southwest to FM 404 (now SH 185) at Bloomington, replacing FM 1302.

FM 617

FM 618

FM 619

Farm to Market Road 619 (FM 619) is  located in Lee and Williamson counties.

FM 619 begins in Lee County at FM 696, just north of the Bastrop County line. It travels northward and soon enters Williamson County. The route is primarily rural and does not go through any major cities or communities, other than passing just east of Taylor, where it has a brief concurrency with  FM 112 and crosses  US 79. The route's northern terminus is at  FM 1331, south of Granger Lake.

The highway has one spur route, FM Spur 619, which runs from just north of the Williamson–Lee county line eastward and southward to the county line. It is a former alignment of the main route through the community of Beaukiss.

FM 619 was designated in Williamson County on June 11, 1945, beginning at FM 112 and ending in the community of Structure. The southern extension to the Lee County line, along what is the present-day route and its spur route south of the junction, occurred on December 17, 1952. On September 29, 1954, a southward extension into Lee County was designated, and the two routes were joined via a new alignment, creating the spur route. The northward extension to  FM 1331 took effect on June 28, 1963.

RM 620

Ranch to Market Road 620 (RM 620) is located in Travis and Williamson counties. It runs from SH 71 in Bee Cave to I-35 in Round Rock.

FM 621

FM 622

FM 623

FM 624

FM 625

FM 626

FM 627

RM 628

 This was originally FM 628.

FM 629

FM 630

FM 631

FM 632

FM 632 (1945–1969)

The first use of the FM 632 designation was in San Patricio County. FM 632 was designated on July 9, 1945, from Gregory southeast to Ingleside. On June 1, 1948, the road was extended to Aransas Pass. FM 632 was cancelled on January 13, 1969, and transferred to SH 361.

FM/RM 632 (1973–1976)

 The second use of the FM 632 designation was in Mason County, from US 87, 0.5 mile south of US 377 north of Mason, east and south to SH 29. On May 7, 1974, the road was extended west and south to RM 1871, a break in the route was added at RM 386, and FM 632 was changed to RM 632. RM 632 was cancelled on March 5, 1976, and removed from the highway system in exchange for extending FM 2618.

FM 632 (1979–1989)

The third use of the FM 632 designation was in Live Oak County, from US 59/US 281 northeast to US 59 in George West. FM 632 was cancelled on March 28, 1989, and transferred to US 59.

FM 633

FM 634

Farm to Market Road 634 (FM 634) is located in Limestone County. It runs from SH 171 northwest of Mexia southwest to Mexia State School.

FM 634 was designated on October 31, 1958, on the current route.

FM 634 (1945)

The first FM 634 was designated on July 2, 1945, from Silver City to Blooming Grove. On September 26, 1945, the road was extended to SH 22, replacing the former Spur 31. FM 634 was cancelled on July 20, 1948, and reassigned to FM 55.

FM 635

FM 636

FM 637

FM 638

FM 639

Farm to Market Road 639 (FM 639) is located in Navarro County. It runs from SH 22, 1.7 miles west of Frost, to FM 55. There is a concurrency with FM 744.

FM 639 was designated on July 2, 1945, from SH 22, 1.7 miles west of Frost to Emmett. On July 15, 1949, the road was extended to FM 1127 at Rush Prairie. On October 26, 1949, the road was extended to SH 31 at Dawson, replacing FM 1127. On October 29, 1962, the road was shortened to end at FM 744 at Emmett; the section from Emmett east 2.4 miles to FM 918 (as well as FM 918 itself) was transferred to FM 744, the section from FM 918 south 2.1 miles was renumbered FM 1578, the section from 2.1 miles south of FM 918 south 2.3 miles was removed from the highway system (as it was inundated) and the section from 4.4 miles south of FM 918 south to SH 31 was transferred to FM 709. On August 31, 1971, the road was extended south and east to FM 55, creating a concurrency with FM 744 and replacing FM 3164. Note that one section from FM 744 to the former end of FM 3164 has not been built yet.

FM 640

Farm to Market Road 640 (FM 640) is located in Wharton County. The three-mile-long highway starts at FM 102 east of Glen Flora, heads to the north and ends at FM 1161 in Spanish Camp.

A two-lane highway along its entire route, FM 640 begins at a stop sign on FM 102  to the east of Glen Flora. According to the United States Geological Survey 1953 Glen Flora 7.5' quadrangle map, the intersection is midway between Glen Flora and the one-time community of Sorrelle. FM 640 heads straight to the north-northeast for  then curves sharply to the northwest. Just after the curve, the highway crosses Baughman Slough, a small watercourse. After going northwest for a short distance, FM 640 bends to the right twice until it is going to the north-northeast. For the next , FM 640 goes in a straight line to the north-northwest. After curving to the left and right, FM 640 goes  before coming to a stop sign at FM 1161 in Spanish Camp. In its final stretch the highway crosses Peach Creek and there were a number of natural gas wells in the area in 1952.

On May 23, 1951, FM 640 was redesignated to start at FM 102 near Glen Flora in Wharton County and continue in a northerly direction to FM 1161 in Spanish Camp.

FM 640 (1945)

FM 640 was designated on July 2, 1945, to start in Navarro County at a cemetery to the northeast of Streetman. On July 3, 1946, the highway was cancelled and the right-of-way was transferred to FM 246. On September 10, 1968, this section of FM 246 was renumbered as FM 416 (FM 640 was already taken).

FM 641

FM 642

FM 643

FM 644

FM 645

FM 645 (1945)

The first FM 645 was designated from US 271 south of Gilmer southeast to Glenwood. Later, FM 645 was redesignated from US 271 at Bettie northwest to Thomas (also known as Simpsonville). FM 645 was cancelled on May 23, 1951, and became a portion of FM 852 (now FM 2088).

FM 646

Farm to Market Road 646 (FM 646) is a designator that has been used three times. The current use is in Galveston County, from FM 2004 at Hitchcock to FM 517 at San Leon. There is a concurrency with SH 6 in Santa Fe.

The highway begins at FM 2004 in Hitchcock, Texas. It runs north to Texas State Highway 6 in Santa Fe, Texas. It briefly merges with Highway 6, heading northwest, and then branches off and keeps heading north. The highway has intersections with Farm to Market Road 1764 and Farm to Market Road 517 before turning northeast and intersecting Interstate 45 soon after. The highway continues northeast and passes into Dickinson, where it intersects Texas State Highway 3 and turns east before intersecting Farm to Market Road 1266. The highway intersects Farm to Market Road 3436 before turning northeast again. The highway intersects Texas State Highway 146 and passes through Bacliff. Once it reaches Bayshore Drive, it turns abruptly southeast and continues into San Leon. The highway ends at its second intersection with FM 517.

FM 646 was designated on December 17, 1952, from FM 517 south to SH 6 near Alta Loma. It was formerly FM 517, and before that, FM 520. On October 31, 1958, the road was extended  to the Brazoria County line. On December 5, 1961, the section of FM 646 from SH 6 to the Brazoria County line was transferred to FM 1561. On October 8, 1964, the road was extended to FM 2004, replacing a section of FM 1561 (which was cancelled, as the remainder of FM 1561 became part of FM 2004) and creating a concurrency with SH 6. On May 25, 1976, the road was extended north  to I-45 & FM 3002. On February 8, 1980, the road was extended to FM 517 southwest of Bacliff, replacing FM 3002. On July 20, 1982, by district request, the road was extended to FM 517 in San Leon, replacing a section of FM 3436. On June 27, 1995, the section from SH 6 to UR 517 at San Leon was transferred to UR 646, but was changed back to FM 646 on November 15, 2018.

FM 646 is the possible route of Texas State Highway 99, known as the Grand Parkway between Highway 146 and Interstate 45. It will become the third loop around the city of Houston. However, many businesses would have to be destroyed for the highway to be built along the FM, so a change to the plans is likely.

Junction list

FM 646 (1945–1951)

The first use of the FM 646 designation was in Fisher County, from Rotan west . On July 14, 1949, the road was extended southwest  miles to a road intersection. FM 646 was cancelled on July 11, 1951, and combined with FM 611.

FM 646 (1951–1952)

The second use of the FM 646 designation was in Polk County, from FM 62 at Camden southeast to Barnes and then south to Hortense as a replacement of a section of FM 62. This designation was short-lived as FM 646 was transferred to FM 942 six months later.

FM 647

Farm to Market Road 647 (FM 647) is located in Wharton County. The 7.123-mile-long highway starts at County Road 325 west of  Louise, heads to the southeast and ends at County Road 336.

On May 23, 1951, FM 647 was redesignated to start at US 59 (now Loop 523) in Louise and continue southeasterly . On November 20, 1951, the highway extended southeast  to County Road 336. On June 1, 1965, another section from created from US 59 (now Loop 523) in Louise west  to County Road 325.

FM 647 (1945)

The first FM 647 was designated on August 13, 1945, from Emory to Dunbar. On August 22, 1945, the road was extended to 1 mile south of the Hopkins County line. FM 647 was cancelled on September 26, 1945, and became a portion of SH 19.

RM 648

 This was originally FM 648.

FM 649

Farm to Market Road 649 (FM 649) is located in South Texas.

FM 649 begins in the Rio Grande Valley at a junction with  US 83 in Garceno. The route travels northward through sparsely populated sections of Starr County before entering Jim Hogg County. In the vicinity of the unincorporated community of Randado, FM 649 has a brief concurrency with  SH 16 before resuming its northward journey. The highway enters Webb County and passes through Mirando City before reaching its northern terminus at  SH 359 west of Oilton.

FM 649 was designated in Starr County on August 13, 1945. Its southern terminus has always been at US 83 in Garceno; its original north end was at the Starr–Jim Hogg county line. On March 31, 1948, it was extended northward into Jim Hogg County, to FM 496 at Randado; this section of FM 496 became SH 16 on August 31, 1965. On August 5, 1954, the northern segment into Webb County was added, to what was then US 59 near Oilton; that section of US 59 became SH 359 19 days later. This extension replaced FM 1904, which went from FM 496 to US 59.

FM 650

FM 651

Farm to Market Road 651 (FM 651) is a  farm-to-market road located in the South Plains region.

FM 651 begins at an intersection with SH 207 in Post. The highway runs northeast and turns north just before the Farm to Market Road 261 intersection. FM 651 turns northwest just north of Farm to Market Road 2794 and turns north again near Crosby County Road 214. The highway enters the town of Crosbyton where it meets U.S. Route 82/SH 114. FM 651 predominately runs north before ending at Floyd County Road 232.

FM 651 was designated on August 23, 1945, from Crosbyton southward . On October 14, 1946 (agreed on May 12, 1947), FM 651 was extended north  to Big Four School. On July 20, 1948, FM 651 was extended northward  to White River Canyon. On May 23, 1951, FM 651 was extended south  to a road intersection. On November 20, 1951, FM 651 was extended east  to Kalgary. On December 17, 1952, the section of FM 651 from 3 miles west of Kalgary to Kalgary was renumbered FM 2082 (now FM 261). FM 651 was extended north to US 82, replacing FM 151, and southwest to FM 122 (now SH 207), replacing FM 1618. On April 14, 1959, a spur connection in Lakeview was added.

Junction list

RM 652

RM 652 is a  route in West Texas near the New Mexico state line.

The route travels east into Reeves County, intersecting  at Orla. RM 652 then crosses the Pecos River into Loving County, before ending at Eddy County Rd. 1 at the Texas/New Mexico state line.

On May 23, 1951, Farm to Market Road 652 (FM 652) was assigned to a  road from US 285 at Orla, northeastward. On November 21, 1956, it was extended northeastward  to its current eastern terminus at the Texas/New Mexico state line. On February 27, 1958, it was redesignated RM 652 and extended  westward from Orla to US 62 south of Pine Springs. On June 3, 1975, the western terminus was moved to the northeast again, giving RM 652 its current western terminus.

FM 652 (1945)

On July 9, 1945, FM 652 was assigned to a road to the north of Odessa in Ector County from SH 51 (now US 385) to SH 302.

FM 653

FM 654

FM 654 (1945)

The first FM 654 was designated on August 13, 1945, from SH 26, 2 miles south of De Kalb, west . FM 654 was cancelled on October 1, 1946, and became a portion of FM 561. This portion of FM 561 became part of FM 44 in 1958.

FM 655

Farm to Market Road 655 (FM 655) is located in Brazoria County. It provides access to the Texas Department of Criminal Justice's  Ramsey, Terrell, and Stringfellow units.

FM 655 begins as two spurs at the prison complex; the mainline of FM 655 follows the northern spur while the southern is designated FM 655 Spur. The two spurs travel through farm fields before joining. From here, FM 655 continues east through farmland within the prison complex. The highway then heads into Bonney and ends at FM 521.

FM 655 was designated on August 24, 1945, to run from SH 288 (now FM 521) west to the Ramsey Prison Farm. On January 11, 1980, FM 655 was defined onto its current alignment, with the southern spur added.

FM 656

FM 657

FM 658

FM 659

Farm to Market Road 659 (FM 659) is located in El Paso.

FM 659 begins at an intersection with FM 76 in southeastern El Paso, with Zaragoza Road continuing south to the El Paso Ysleta Port of Entry at the Ysleta–Zaragoza International Bridge. The highway travels in a slight northeast direction and crosses I-10. At I-10, FM 659's name briefly changes from Zaragoza Road to George Dieter Road. The highway turns right at George Dieter Road, with the Zaragoza Road designation continuing. FM 659 travels northeast through a heavily developed area of the city, passing by many residential areas and commercial shopping centers. FM 659 turns right at Montwood Drive before briefly traveling along the frontage road of Loop 375. Past Loop 375, FM 659 resumes running in its northeast direction before ending at US 62/US 180 near Homestead Meadows South.

FM 659 was designated on September 4, 1945, along its current route. An  extension south from FM 76 to the Rio Grande was proposed on December 16, 1948, but cancelled on February 25, 1954. On June 27, 1995, the entire route was redesignated Urban Road 659 (UR 659). The designation reverted to FM 659 with the elimination of the Urban Road system on November 15, 2018.

Junction list

FM 660

Farm to Market Road 660 (FM 660) is located in Ellis County.

FM 660 begins in rural eastern Ellis County at an intersection with SH 34 just over 1 mile east of Ennis. It travels northbound from the east–west stretch of SH 34, bridging Fourmile Creek before it banks east as it merges onto Crisp Road. As it passes through the unincorporated community of Crisp, it then banks north and snakes towards an intersection with FM 813. At this intersection, FM 813 terminates as FM 660 banks east through Bristol, before banking north and making its way down Sugar Ridge. As it travels northbound, FM 660 briefly makes its way through the Trinity River Floodplain and crests over a levee locally known as "The Bristol Bump" because of its sharp and sudden crest potentially sending unsuspecting drivers airborne for a brief moment. FM 660 then travels northeast towards Ferris through the foothills bordering the Trinity River Floodplain, intersecting with FM 710 roughly 6 miles northeast of Bristol and 2.5 miles east of Ferris. FM 660 then intersects with Interstate 45 just before reaching its northern terminus with Business Interstate 45 in downtown Ferris.

FM 660 was designated on August 31, 1945. It consisted of an  stretch connecting Bristol to the SH 34 intersection. The northern extension to Ferris was later added on April 1, 1948, bringing FM 660 to its present-day length.

FM 661

FM 662

Farm to Market Road 662 (FM 662) is located in Midland County.

The current FM 662 was designated on September 26, 1979, from FM 1369 (now SH 158) to Industrial Avenue at of distance of 3.2 miles. On August 29, 1989, the highway was extended 2.1 miles to FM 1788. On June 27, 1995, the entire route was redesignated Urban Road 662 (UR 662). The designation reverted to FM 662 with the elimination of the Urban Road system on November 15, 2018.

FM 662 (1945)

The first FM 662 was designated on August 31, 1945, from US 75 (now I-45), 2.8 miles south of Ennis, to Hopewell School. On October 31, 1957, the road was extended east  to FM 1129. FM 662 was cancelled on November 1, 1961, and transferred to FM 85.

FM 663

FM 664

Farm to Market Road 664 (FM 664) is located in Ellis County.

FM 664, known locally as Ovilla Road, is a major access road for the northern sections of Ellis County. It begins at Bus. US 287, the former route of US 287 in Waxahachie. It briefly travels north along the de facto frontage road for southbound I-35E at exit 401B. After passing the interstate, the route continues north approximately nine miles into Ovilla, where it makes an abrupt right-hand turn and continues to the east for the remainder of its length. It crosses I-35E again (passing over the Boxcar Willie Memorial Overpass) and also SH 342 in Red Oak before terminating at FM 983 near Ferris.

FM 664 was designated on August 31, 1945, and ran from near Waxahachie to Ovilla, with a southern terminus at US 287 (later Loop 528, now signed as US 287 Business). It was lengthened to US 77 (now the I-35E freeway) on September 20, 1961. An extension east 4 miles on June 1, 1965, and another extension to Ferris on June 4, 1970, brought the route to its current length.

Junction list

FM 665

Farm to Market Road 665 (FM 665) is located in Jim Wells and Nueces counties.

FM 665 begins in downtown Alice, at an intersection with SH 44 / SH 359. The route travels to the south along Cameron Street before turning to the east, and passes Alice International Airport before entering Nueces County. FM 665 intersects US 77 (Future I-69E) in Driscoll and passes through the town of Petronila before turning more toward the northeast to enter Corpus Christi. The route intersects SH 357 in the outskirts of Corpus Christi before crossing the SH 358 expressway and entering downtown. FM 665 ends at an intersection with Spur 544 (signed as a business route of SH 44).

FM 665 was designated on September 10, 1945, from US 77 in Driscoll to SH 44 in Corpus Christi. It was extended to Alice on November 2, 1955, replacing a portion of FM 666 from Driscoll to current FM 666 and the entirety of FM 736 from FM 70 to SH 359, though signage did not change until the updated official travel map was given out. On June 27, 1995, the portion east of SH 357 in Corpus Christi was redesignated Urban Road 665 (UR 665). The designation of this section reverted to FM 665 with the elimination of the Urban Road system on November 15, 2018.

FM 666

Farm to Market Road 666 (FM 666) is located in Nueces and San Patricio counties.

FM 666 begins at FM 70 in Bishop. It travels north, intersecting SH 44 in Banquete and FM 624 in Bluntzer. The road crosses into San Patricio County at the city of San Patricio, and, during the end of its route, is parallel to Interstate 37 to its east. FM 666 ends in the city of Mathis at SH 359; the roadway continues as a business route of SH 359 through Mathis.

FM 666 was designated on September 10, 1945, from SH 44 in Banquete southward and eastward to US 77 in Driscoll. On July 14, 1949, the designation was extended north to US 59 (present-day SH 359) in Mathis. On September 21, 1955, the section of FM 666 from US 77 to its current junction with FM 665 was transferred to FM 665. On October 31, 1957, FM 666 was extended south to its current southern terminus at FM 70.

In 2018, the section of FM 666 between FM 624 and SH 44 was designated the Kollyn Gene Barton Memorial Highway. Barton, a Banquete High School student, was killed in a vehicle accident along the highway in 2016.

Junction list

FM 667

FM 668

FM 669

Farm to Market Road 669 (FM 669) is located in West Texas.

Near the intersection of FM 1785, FM 669 drops off the Caprock and enters the rolling ranch and oil country of Borden County. The undulating, broken land of Borden County was carved by numerous ephemeral tributaries of the upper Colorado River that typically originate as springs along the Caprock Escarpment to the west and generally flow across the county in an easterly direction.

Near Gail, one passes two prominent erosional remnants of the Llano Estacado. To the south of Gail, one can see a conspicuous landmark known as Mushaway Peak (also known as Muchakooaga, Muchaque Peak or Cordova Peak); this small butte stands on high ground between Grape Creek and Bull Creek, two tributaries of the upper Colorado River. A much larger mesa, called Gail Mountain, stands on the western edge of Gail and provides a scenic backdrop for this small town.

In Gail, FM 669 crosses U.S. Highway 180, which runs west-east from Lamesa to Snyder and beyond. Continuing north, FM 669 draws closer to the edge of the Llano Estacado, which can be seen  to the west.

Farther north, near the Borden-Garza county line, FM 669 reaches a high point that divides the drainage of the upper Brazos and Colorado rivers. Along this drainage divide, the land is highly denuded with many small buttes and hoodoos.  Less than a mile north of the county line is a historical marker that describes an archaeological site where the "Garza Point" was first identified. These distinctive arrowheads were constructed from local flint, chert, and obsidian by Native Americans living and hunting in this area around A.D. 1440 to 1500.

FM 669 remains on the level plains for a short distance of only  before suddenly dropping off the Caprock and descending  back to the rolling plains and to the town of Post, the county seat of Garza County. Within the city limits of Post, FM 669 terminates at a junction with U.S. Route 380.

FM 669 was designated on September 24, 1945, from US 180 at Gail south . On March 30, 1949, FM 669 was extended south  to a county road. On November 20, 1951, FM 669 was extended to FM 1584 at Vealmoor. On May 5, 1952, FM 669 was extended to US 87, replacing FM 1857. On October 30, 1953, the section of FM 669 from the current junction with FM 1785 to US 87 was renumbered FM 1785. FM 669 instead extended south to SH 350 near Big Spring, replacing FM 817. On November 21, 1956, FM 669 was extended north to FM 1313. On May 1, 1965, the section of FM 1313 from FM 669 to US 380 was transferred to FM 669.

Junction list

FM 670

FM 671

FM 672

FM 673

RM 674

 This was originally FM 674.

FM 675

FM 676

Farm to Market Road 676 (FM 676) is located in Hidalgo County.

FM 676 begins at an intersection with FM 492 in northeastern Doffing. The highway travels in a generally eastern direction along Mile 5 Road and intersects SH 364 in La Homa, then enters Alton. In Alton, FM 676 intersects SH 107 and FM 494. State maintenance for the highway ends at an intersection with FM 2220 at the McAllen city limits.

The Alton, Texas bus crash occurred along FM 676 in Alton on September 21, 1989.

FM 676 was designated on June 26, 1945, from SH 107 5 miles north of Mission eastward . On July 15, 1949, FM 676 was extended west  to a road that would become part of FM 492 on May 23, 1951. On May 23, 1951, FM 676 was extended east  to Taylor Road. On September 28, 2017, FM 676 was extended east  to FM 2220.

FM 677

Farm to Market Road 677 (FM 677) is located in Montague County.

FM 677 is one of the longest farm to market roads in Montague County, and is a two-lane route for its entire length. It begins in Forestburg at a junction with  FM 477. It travels northward through the rural eastern part of the county, reaching St. Jo and an intersection with  US 82. It continues northward, through the unincorporated communities of Capps Corner and Illinois Bend, close to the Cooke County line. It briefly turns to the west before resuming its northward journey toward the Red River. The FM 677 designation ends as the route crosses into Love County, Oklahoma across the Taovoyas Indian Bridge; the roadway continues as Oklahoma State Highway 89.

It was extended north 2.5 miles on May 23, 1951, south 2.9 miles on November 20, 1951, and again southward on December 17, 1952, to Hardy near the  FM 1630 intersection. The route's designation was extended further northward to 3 miles north of Capps Corner on December 2, 1953, and to Illinois Bend on September 29, 1954; the same day also so the lengthening to Forestburg. The connection to the Red River was made on April 24, 1958, and the concurrency with US 82 in St. Jo was removed on June 30, 1961. The connection to Oklahoma was made on December 20, 1988. A spur connection was added on April 25, 1996.

While the designation file indicates that the route enters Cooke County, this contradicts the information in TxDOT's planning file.

FM 678

FM 679

FM 679 (1946)

The first FM 679 was designated on February 21, 1946, from US 60 at Umbarger south to Buffalo Lake. On October 25, 1947, the northern terminus was moved to a county road north of US 60 (now FM 1062). On September 21, 1955, the road was extended south  along Buffalo Lake. On November 21, 1956, the road was extended south to the Castro county line. FM 679 was cancelled on December 14, 1956, and transferred to FM 168.

FM 680

FM 680 (1946)

The first FM 680 was designated on February 21, 1946, as an extension of Georgia Street in Amarillo, from the Potter County Line south to US 87. Two months later FM 680 was cancelled and transferred to FM 286.

FM 681

FM 682

FM 683

FM 684

FM 684 (1946)

The first FM 684 was designated on February 23, 1946, from US 80 near the triple overpass at Dallas to Irving and then on to Loop 183 close to where Belt Line Road intersects SH 183 near the Dallas/Tarrant County line. Two months later FM 684 was cancelled and reassigned to SH 356.

FM 685

Farm to Market Road 685 (FM 685) is located in Greater Austin.

FM 685 begins in Pflugerville at the northern terminus of Dessau Road and at the eastern terminus of FM 1825. The route runs to the northeast through Pflugerville to an interchange with the  SH 45 Toll / SH 130 Toll toll road. From here, FM 685 runs north along the frontage road of the toll road, before separating from SH 130 in southern Hutto. The route continues to the northeast before ending at a junction with  US 79 in central Hutto.

FM 685 was designated in Williamson County on May 15, 1946, on an existing roadway, running from US 79 at Hutto southward to the Travis County line. The designation was extended into Travis County and Pflugerville on December 17, 1952, to its current southern terminus at FM 1825.

When the SH 130 toll road was constructed, the segment between Pflugerville and Hutto used the right-of-way of FM 685. The FM 685 designation was subsequently applied to the frontage roads of the toll road.

Junction list

FM 686

RM 687

 This was originally FM 687.

FM 688

Farm to Market Road 688 (FM 688) is located in Kaufman County. It runs through Forney along an old routing of US 80. It is known locally as Broad Street. The highway begins at an interchange with US 80 and ends at an intersection with FM 548.

FM 688 was designated on January 18, 1960, along its current route.

Junction list

FM 688 (1946)

The first FM 688 was designated on May 15, 1946, in Taylor County, from US 84 at Lawn to US 83 at Ovalo. On December 16, 1948, the section from Lawn to the Callahan County line was added. On July 11, 1951, the section from Lawn to the Callahan County line was transferred to FM 604; another  section was transferred to FM 604 on February 20, 1952. On November 27, 1957, the remainder of FM 688 was cancelled and transferred to FM 382.

FM 689

FM 689 (1946)

The first FM 689 was designated on June 4, 1946, from PR 19 inside Kerrville State Park (now Kerrville-Schreiner Park; PR 19 was given to the city once it lost its state park status) south through Camp Verde to Bandera in substitution for FM 481. On April 27, 1948, the road was extended northward to SH 16, replacing a portion of PR 19. On February 1, 1972, FM 689 was signed, but not designated, as SH 173. On November 15, 1978, the section of FM 689 from SH 16 to PR 19 was transferred to Loop 534 (but still signed as SH 173). FM 689 was cancelled on August 29, 1990, as the extension of SH 173 over this road was officially designated.

RM 690
Ranch to Market Road 690 (RM 690) is located in Burnet County. along the east side of Lake Buchanan.

FM 690 (1946)

FM 690 was designated on May 29, 1945, from US 84, 2 miles east of Farwell, east  to Oklahoma Lane School. On December 16, 1948, the road was extended east  via Midway School to a road intersection and the old route to Oklahoma Lane School became a spur of FM 690. On July 5, 1951, the spur to Oklahoma Lane School was cancelled and became a portion of FM 1731. On October 29, 1953, the road was extended  to 1 mile east of Lazbuddie. On October 31, 1957, the road was extended east to SH 51. FM 690 was cancelled on November 21, 1957, and transferred to FM 145, although the US 84-FM 299 (note that FM 299 was signed as and later became part of SH 214) section remained signed as FM 690 until 1958.

RM 690 (1959)

RM 690 was designated on November 24, 1959, from US 290 at Hye southward  to RM 1623 near Albert. RM 690 was cancelled by 1965 and was removed from the state highway system.

FM 691

Farm to Market Road 691 (FM 691) is located in Grayson County. The highway is known locally as Grayson Drive in the Sherman–Denison metropolitan area.

FM 691 begins at an intersection with Perimeter Road near North Texas Regional Airport in Sherman and has an intersection with FM 1417 just east of here. The highway passes Grayson College before sharing an overlap with FM 131. FM 691 straddles the Sherman-Denison line and crosses US 75 before ending at an intersection with SH 91.

FM 691 was designated on April 16, 1946, from Camp Perrin to US 75 (now SH 91). It was previously War Highway 12. On June 27, 1995, the entire route was redesignated Urban Road 691 (UR 691). The designation reverted to FM 691 with the elimination of the Urban Road system on November 15, 2018.

Junction list

FM 692

Farm to Market Road 692 (FM 692) is located in Newton County.

FM 692 begins at a junction with SH 63 in Burkeville. From here, the highway heads north a rural area. The route then turns to the northeast, following a twisting route through farmland. After turning north again, the road crosses three creeks and passes Gunter Cemetery. The highway then reaches a junction with Recreational Road 255 in South Toledo Bend. After passing Spur 135 north of that junction, FM 692 crosses a channel connecting the Toledo Bend Reservoir to the Sabine River and heads north alongside the Toledo Bend Dam. FM 692 ends at the Louisiana state line while along the dam; the road continues into Louisiana as Highway 191.

On May 23, 1951, FM 692 was designated along part of its current route,  from SH 63 northward. The highway was extended 2.8 more miles on November 20, 1951.

On September 27, 1960, FM 692 was extended north . On September 20, 1961, FM 692 was extended north . On May 6, 1964, it was extended north . On August 26, 1969, FM 692 was extended  to the Louisiana state line.

FM 692 (1946)

The original FM 692 was designated on June 4, 1946, from FM 665 southwest of Corpus Christi southeast , then northeast to FM 693 (now SH 358). FM 692 was cancelled three months later, and its mileage was transferred to SH 357.

RM 693

Ranch to Market Road 693 (RM 693) is a  route in southwest Kinney County.

RM 693 was designated on May 23, 1951, as Farm to Market Road 693 (FM 693), from US 90 southwestward . On November 20, 1951, the road was extended to US 277. FM 693 was changed to RM 693 on October 17, 1959.

FM 693 (1946)

FM 693 was originally designated on June 4, 1946, from SH 286 south of Corpus Christi southeast to Naval Air Station Corpus Christi. This route was renumbered SH 358 on September 5, 1946.

FM 694

FM 695

FM 696

Farm to Market Road 696 (FM 696) is  located in Bastrop, Lee and Burleson counties.

FM 696 was designated on July 31, 1946, from SH 20 (now US 290) northeast  to Butler. On November 23, 1948, FM 696 was extended northeast to the Bastrop-Lee county line, and another section from Blue in Lee County east to FM 112 was added, creating a gap. On July 14, 1949, FM 696 was extended from the Bastrop-Lee county line to Blue, closing the gap. On June 11, 1965, FM 696 was extended southeast to SH 21, replacing FM 1574.

FM 697

FM 698

FM 699

Farm to Market Road 699 is located in Panola and Shelby counties. It runs from US 79 in Carthage to SH 87 in Center.

FM 699 was designated on September 13, 1946 from Center to Jericho School. FM 699 was extended north 2.1 miles on May 5, 1966, north to US 84 at Paxton on August 31, 1966 (replacing FM 416) and north to US 79 in Carthage on November 3, 1970 (replacing FM 1401, signage effective January 1, 1971). On June 18, 1996 FM 699 was rerouted due to expansion of Center Municipal Airport; a 0.58 mile section became FM 699 Spur, another section became an extension of FM 1656 and a 1.62 mile section was removed altogether.

Notes

References

+06
Farm to market roads 0600
Farm to Market Roads 0600